This is a list of all the US Supreme Court cases from volume 431 of the United States Reports:

External links

1977 in United States case law